The Hôtel de Lassay is a private mansion located on the rue de l'Université, in the 7th arrondissement of Paris, France. It is the current residence of the President of the National Assembly, and adjoins the Palais Bourbon, the seat of the lower house of Parliament.

The Hôtel de Lassay is also adjacent to the hotel of the Minister of Foreign Affairs, headquarters of the Ministry for Europe and Foreign Affairs.

References

External links

Palaces in Paris
Legislative buildings in Europe
National Assembly (France)
Buildings and structures in the 7th arrondissement of Paris
Neoclassical architecture in Paris